Loðmundur is a  high mountain in the Kerlingarfjöll mountain range in Iceland. It stands by itself on the northeast edge of the range. The hills are very steep and the top section is surrounded by near-vertical cliffs. The top itself is flat once reached.

The mountain is 175,000 years old.

References 

Mountains of Iceland
One-thousanders of Iceland
Mid-Iceland Belt